Memphis Heights is an unincorporated area in Manatee County, Florida, United States.

References

Unincorporated communities in Manatee County, Florida
Unincorporated communities in Florida